Guadeloupe National Park is a national park in Guadeloupe, an overseas department of France located in the Leeward Islands of the eastern Caribbean region.  The Grand Cul-de-Sac Marin Nature Reserve (French: Réserve Naturelle du Grand Cul-de-Sac Marin) is a marine protected area adjacent to the park and administered in conjunction with it. Together, these protected areas comprise the Guadeloupe Archipelago (French: l'Archipel de la Guadeloupe) biosphere reserve.

History 
The General Council of Guadeloupe created the Guadeloupe Natural Park in 1970 to recognise the exceptional biodiversity of Basse-Terre's tropical forest and mountain massif. Although it was initially placed under the management of the National Forests Office, proposals emerged in 1977 to establish a national park, in order to improve management and control of the park lands.  These proposals came to fruition on 20 February 1989 with the official establishment of Guadeloupe National Park.

The Grand Cul-de-Sac Marin Nature Reserve was established in 1987, and subsequently placed under the management of the park.

In 1992, Guadeloupe National Park achieved international recognition when the core area of the park and the Grand Cul-de-Sac Marin Nature Reserve were designated as an international biosphere reserve by UNESCO.

For most of its history, it was the only French national park outside of metropolitan France. However, it lost that distinction with the 2007 creation of Réunion National Park (Réunion) and Guiana Amazonian Park (French Guiana).

Geography 
The Grand Cul-de-Sac Marin Nature Reserve comprises  marine, and  terrestrial.

The highest point in the park is the summit of La Soufrière, an active volcano. Other notable peaks include: Échelle, Grand-Sans-Toucher, and the twin side-by-side summits of the Mamelles.

The park comprises parts of 11 communes:

Vieux-Habitants
Bouillante
Pointe-Noire
Lamentin
Petit-Bourg
Goyave
Capesterre-Belle-Eau
Trois-Rivières
Gourbeyre
Saint-Claude
Baillif

Vegetation
Guadeloupe National Park may broadly be divided into three ecosystem types:

Tropical rainforest
The park's tropical rainforest varies in its character and species among several sub-ecosystems, depending heavily on elevation.
 The lower elevations (up to ) of the park's buffer zone support a mesophilic forest, featuring trees such as white and red mahogany, rosewood, and jatobá. This ecologic area is also used for agriculture, including banana plantations and other food crops.
 The high-elevation forests above  are much less dense than the park's other forests, due to the extremely wet conditions and constant cloud cover. These forests resemble savannas.

Coastal forest
Vegetation in the coastal zone faces the challenges of salinity in the air and soil, intense heat from the sun and its drying effect, and the constant wind. Notable plant species in this environment include seagrape and pear.

Mangrove
The Grand Cul-de-Sac Marin Nature Reserve includes coastal wetland forests that are flooded either permanently or intermittently by fresh or salt water, comprising nearly half of Guadeloupe's mangrove swamps ( of ).

Wildlife
Due to intensive hunting during an earlier period in Guadeloupe's history, animal life in the park is limited in diversity and in populations. Some species, including parrots and parakeets, have been eradicated altogether.

Mammals
The park has 17 mammalian species. The most commonly seen mammals in the park are the Guadeloupe raccoon, bats (two species of which are endemic to Guadeloupe), mongooses (introduced from India), and the endangered agouti. Park authorities plan to reintroduce the manatee, which has been extinct in Guadeloupe for a while.

Birds
The park's birds are more numerous than mammals, numbering 33 bird species, and the visitor may encounter hummingbirds, frigatebirds, thrushes, partridges, pigeons, tyrant flycatchers, pelicans, endemic Guadeloupe woodpeckers, and others.

Reptiles
 Some sea turtles are found.

Fish
 Various types of koi fish are visible in the area.

Crustaceans
 Aquatic and marine life includes big-claw river shrimp and crabs.

Insects
 Insects are indubitably the most plentiful creatures in the park, their exceptional diversity resulting in a number of surprising forms. Some attain great size, such as Hercules beetles, the duppy bats (black witch moths), and walking sticks.

Tourist attractions

Among the interesting visitor sites in Guadeloupe National Park are:
 La Soufrière
 Carbet Falls
 the two Mamelles and the Traversée road
 Grand Cul-de-Sac Marin Nature Reserve
 numerous hiking trails throughout the park

See also
 National parks of France
 World Network of Biosphere Reserves
 World Network of Biosphere Reserves in Latin America and the Caribbean

External links
  Official site of Guadeloupe National Park
  Official site of Grand Cul-de-Sac Marin Nature Reserve
 UNEP-WCMC data sheet on the core area of the park
 UNEP-WCMC data sheet on the buffer zone of the park

References

Protected areas of Guadeloupe
Biosphere reserves of France
Natural history of Guadeloupe
Protected areas established in 1989
Tourist attractions in Guadeloupe
1989 establishments in France
1989 establishments in North America